The Voice Indonesia is a reality television singing competition created by John de Mol which premiered in Indonesia on 10 February 2013 on Indosiar. The format is Dutch and the original Dutch version of the programme was broadcast in the Netherlands for the first time in 2010 as The Voice of Holland. The show replaced the previous singing contest show Akademi Fantasi Indosiar. Season 2 will be aired in the RCTI. RCTI once again appointed Fabian Dharmawan to produce The Voice Indonesia after successful seasons with Indonesian Idol, X Factor Indonesia and Sasuke Ninja Warrior Indonesia. This program replaces the previous programs singing talent contest, Indonesian Idol because the broadcast is over from 2004 to 2014 and now otherwise been removed from list of programs RCTI. Indosiar dropped The Voice Indonesia after the first season due to poor ratings. In 2016, the RCTI won the rights to the show, and a second season went into production. In June 2017, RCTI announced that Indonesian Idol, another singing talent show seeking to discover the best singer through nationwide auditions, would return in 2018 and that The Voice Indonesia would not continue in RCTI. However, in June 2018, it was announced that a TV station GTV revived The Voice Indonesia for the third season.

The original judging panel line-up in 2013 consisted of Armand Maulana, Giring Ganesha, Glenn Fredly and Sherina Munaf. When the show was revived in 2016, the judging panel was replaced by Ari Lasso, Agnez Mo, Kaka "Slank" and Judika.

The programme was commissioned after a successful first series in the US, where the programme aired on NBC. The winner receives Rp 100,000,000, a car, and a record deal with Universal Music Indonesia for Season 1 until 3, and Hits Records for Season 4. The Season 3 winner received Rp 250,000,000, which was won by Ronaldo Longa.

History
The Voice Indonesia was created by John de Mol in the Netherlands and is based on the original Dutch series. de Mol then began to grow and expand the competition franchise of The Voice and in 2013, the Indonesian version of the show was launched on Indosiar, the same channel as the highly successful Akademi Fantasi Indosiar. However, due to poor ratings, Indosiar dropped The Voice Indonesia after one season.

In 2016, once the eighth and final season of Indonesian Idol was completed (the vows were canceled and rolled out again in the ninth season), it was announced that RCTI went into a "bidding war" with Global TV to obtain the rights of The Voice Indonesia, which they later won and a second season went into production.

Format 
The series consists of four phases: 
 The blind auditions
 The battle round
 The knockout round (Season 2)
 Live performance shows

The Blind Auditions
Four judges/coaches, all famous musicians, will choose teams of contestants through a blind audition process. Each judge has the length of the auditionee's performance to decide if he or she wants that singer on his or her team; if two or more judges want the same singer then the singer gets to choose which coach they want to work with. In the fourth season, a new twist called "Block" is featured, which allows one coach to block another coach from getting a contestant. The artist's journey on the show comes to an end if no coach selects him/she. The blind auditions end when each coach has a set number of contestants to work with. Coaches dedicate themselves to developing their singers mentally, musically and in some cases physically, giving them advice, and sharing the secrets of their success.

Battle round
Each team of singers will be mentored and developed by their coach. In the second stage, coaches will have two of their team members battle against each other by singing the same song, with the coach choosing which team member will advance to the next stage. A new element was added in season two; coaches were given two "steals", allowing each coach to select two individuals who were eliminated during a battle round by another coach.

Knockout round (Season 2)
As with the battle round, each team of singers will be mentored and developed by their coach. The Knockout Round determines which three artists from each team will advance to the final round of competition, the Live Shows. In this round, after an artist performs, he or she will sit in one of three seats above the stage. The first three artists performing from each team will sit down, but once the fourth artist performs, a coach has the choice of replacing the fourth artist with any artist sitting down or eliminating them immediately. Once all artists have performed, those who remain seated will advance to the Live Shows.

Live performance shows
In the final phase, the remaining contestants will compete against each other in live broadcasts. The television audience will help to decide who moves on. Once one team member remains for each coach, the contestants compete against each other in the finale.

Hosts and coaches

Hosts
The first season's host was confirmed to be sport presenter Darius Sinathrya. Caroline Conchita served as the "backstage online and social media correspondent" for the live show week 1 and Fenita Arie for week 2 onwards. The second season's host was the TV host, VJ, and actor, Daniel Mananta. The third season was hosted by comedian, actor, and TV host Ananda Omesh from Kids version and Astrid Tiar. Ananda Omesh returned for the fourth season but Astrid Tiar was replaced by Gracia Indri.

Coaches

Season 1
In October 2012, four coaches were chosen: Sherina Munaf, Glenn Fredly, Giring Ganesha and Armand Maulana. Sherina Munaf began her singing, acting, and musical career when she was a girl. Glenn Fredly is a soul-pop singer and known has a lot of romantic songs. Giring Ganesha is a frontman of Nidji, while Armand Maulana is a frontman of Gigi. Coach Glenn Fredly died after a long battle with meningitis on 8 April 2020.

Season 2
In January 2016, four coaches were chosen: Ari Lasso, Kaka Satriaji, Agnez Mo and Judika Sihotang. Agnez Mo began her singing and acting career when she was a girl and becoming one of international superstar. Ari Lasso is a pop rock singer and former frontman of Dewa 19. Kaka is a frontman of Slank, while Judika is a runner-up of Indonesian Idol 2005 and pop-rock singer with huge vocal range.

Season 3
In August 2018, four coaches were chosen: frontman of Gigi Band Armand Maulana who was previously a coach in season 1, international diva and Asia's Got Talent judge Anggun, Indonesian pop diva and former Indonesian Idol judge Titi DJ and, also a duo coach consisting of two young singers, Vidi Aldiano and member of musical group RAN Nino Kayam. In 2013,  Nino Kayam beside member of musical group RAN. He have project musical group with 2 members of musical group Maliq & D'Essential guitarist Lale and keyboardist  Ilman formed of musical group Laleilmanino.

Season 4
The fourth season began in August 2019 with new coach. Young talented singer-songwriter, musician, and actress Isyana Sarasvati replaced Anggun and joined the panel with the remaining coaches.

Coaches' teams
Color key

Winners are in bold, the finalists in the finale are in small italicized font, and the eliminated artists are in small font.

Coaches' timeline

Guest Mentors and Advisors

Series overview 
Colour key

 Team Armand
 Team Glenn
 Team Giring
 Team Sherina
 Team Agnez
 Team Ari
 Team Judika
 Team Kaka
 Team Anggun
 Team Titi DJ
 Team Nino & Vidi
 Team Isyana

Warning: the following table presents a significant amount of different colors.

The Voice All Stars
After a 2-year break, The Voice Indonesia announced through Instagram and other social media platforms that they will be broadcasting  an All-Star edition in 2022. The show will occur by GTV. This season will join by former contestants, former coaches and winners in every season except first season and include Kids version. The coaches are Armand Maulana, Titi DJ, Vidi & Nino & Isyana Sarasvati, same as fourth season of the main show. This edition is hosted by TV host, VJ and actor Robby Purba.
 Team Armand
 Team Titi DJ
 Team Vidi & Nino
 Team Isyana

Accolades

References

External links
 Official website

 
2013 Indonesian television series debuts
Indonesian reality television series
RCTI original programming
Indosiar original programming
GTV (Indonesian TV network) original programming
Indonesian television series based on non-Indonesian television series